Daniel Aceves Villagrán (born November 18, 1964 in Mexico City, Mexico) is a Mexican wrestler. He is son of Bobby Bonales. He competed in wrestling and represented Mexico at the 1984 Summer Olympics in Los Angeles. He won a silver medal in the Men's Greco-Roman 52 kg.

References

External links
 Sports Reference

Olympic silver medalists for Mexico
Sportspeople from Mexico City
Wrestlers at the 1984 Summer Olympics
Mexican male sport wrestlers
1964 births
Living people
Olympic medalists in wrestling
Pan American Games medalists in wrestling
Pan American Games bronze medalists for Mexico
Wrestlers at the 1983 Pan American Games
Medalists at the 1984 Summer Olympics
20th-century Mexican people
21st-century Mexican people